This is a list of vice presidents in 2016.

Africa
  Vice President - Manuel Vicente (2012–2017)
  Vice President - Mokgweetsi Masisi (2014–2018)
 
First Vice President - Gaston Sindimwo (2015–2020)
Second Vice President - Joseph Butore (2015–2020)
  - Vice Presidents -
Mohamed Ali Soilihi (Vice President in charge of Finance, Economy, Budget, Investment, External Trade and Privatization) (2011–2016), Fouad Mohadji (Vice President in Charge of Health, Solidarity, Social Cohesion, and Gender Promotion) (2011–2016), Nourdine Bourhane (Vice President in Charge of Ministry of Regional Planning, Infrastructure, Urbanism, & Housing) (2011–2016)
Djaffar Ahnwd Said Hassani (Vice President in charge of the Ministry of Economy, Planning, Industry, Crafts, Investments, Private Sector and Land Affairs) (2016–2018), - Moustadroine Abdou (Vice President in Charge of the Ministry of Agriculture, Fishing, Environment, Spatial Planning and Urbanism) (2016–2018), Abdallah Said Sarouma (Vice President in Charge of the Minister of Transport, Posts and Telecommunication and Information and Communication Technology) (2016–2018)

1 Vice Presidents -
First Vice President - Ignacio Milam Tang (2012–2016)
Second Vice President - Teodoro Nguema Obiang Mangue (2012–2016)
2 Vice President – Teodoro Nguema Obiang Mangue (2016–present)
  Vice President - Isatou Njie-Saidy (1997–2017)
  Vice President  - Kwesi Amissah-Arthur (2012–2017)
  Vice President - vacant (2016–2017)
  Deputy President - William Ruto (2013–present)
  Vice President -  Joseph Boakai (2006–2018)
Libya
 Government of House of Representatives of Libya  (Government of Libya internationally recognized to 12 March 2016) Deputy presidents of the House of Representatives of Libya -  Imhemed Shaib (2014–2021).  Ahmed Huma (2014–2021)
 National Salvation Government of Libya, government of New General National Congress of Libya  (Government of Libya in rebellion internationally unrecognized. disbanded 5 April 2016) Deputy presidents of the New General National Congress of Libya - Mohammad Awad Abdul-Sadiq (2015–2016), Saleh Makzoon (2016)
  Government of National Accord of Libya  (Interim government internationally recognized as the sole legitimate government of Libya from 12 March 2016) - Vice Presidents of the Presidential Council of Libya (Tripoli) - Musa Al-Koni (2016–2017), Abdulsalam Kajman (2016–2021), Ahmed Maiteeq (2016–2021), Ali Faraj Qatrani (2016–2019)
  Vice President - Saulos Chilima (2014–2019)
  Vice President -
Monique Ohsan Bellepeau (2010-2016)
Barlen Vyapoory (2016–2019)
  Vice President - Nicky Iyambo (2015–2018)
  Vice President - Yemi Osinbajo (2015–present)
  Vice President -
 Danny Faure (2010–2016)
 vacant (2016)
 Vincent Meriton (2016–2020)
  Vice President - Victor Bockarie Foh (2015–2018)
  Vice President - Abdirahman Saylici (2010–present)
  Deputy President - Cyril Ramaphosa (2014–2018)
 
1 Vice President - James Wani Igga (2013–2016)
2 Vice Presidents
First Vice President -
Riek Machar (2016)
Taban Deng Gai (2016–2020)
Vice President - James Wani Igga (2016–2020)
 
First Vice President - Bakri Hassan Saleh (2013–2019)
Second Vice President - Hassabu Mohamed Abdalrahman (2013–2018)
  Vice President - Samia Suluhu (2015–2021)
 
First Vice President - Seif Sharif Hamad (2010–2019)
Second Vice President - Seif Ali Iddi (2010–2020)
  Vice President - Edward Ssekandi (2011–2021)
  Vice President - Inonge Wina (2015–2021)
 
First Vice Presidents - Emmerson Mnangagwa (2014–2017)
Second Vice President - Phelekezela Mphoko (2014–2017)

Asia
  Vice President - Vitali Gabnia (2014–2018)
 
First Vice President - Abdul Rashid Dostum (2014–2020)
Second Vice President - Sarwar Danish (2014–2021)
  Vice President - Li Yuanchao (2013–2018)
  Vice President - Mohammad Hamid Ansari (2007–2017)
  Vice President - Jusuf Kalla (2014–2019)
 
First Vice President - Eshaq Jahangiri (2013–2021)
Others Vice Presidents -
Mohammad Shariatmadari (Vice President for Executive Affairs) (2013–2017), Elham Aminzadeh (Vice President for Legal Affairs) (2013–2016), Majid Ansari  (Vice President for Parliamentary Affairs) (2013–2016). Sorena Sattari (Vice President  for Science and Technology) (2013–2017), Shahindokht Molaverdi (Vice President  for  Women's and Family Affairs)  (2014–2017).  Ali Akbar Salehi (Vice President  and Head, Atomic Energy Organization) (2013–2021). Masoud Soltanifar  (Vice President and Head, Cultural Heritage, Handicrafts, and Tourism Organization) (2013–2016), Masumeh Ebtekar (Vice President and Head, Environmental Protection Organization) (2013–2017), Mohammad-Ali Shahidi  (Vice President and Head of Martyrs and War Veterans Affairs Foundation) (2013–2016), Akbar Torkan (Vice President for International Affairs) (2013–2016)
Mohammad Shariatmadari (Vice President for Executive Affairs)  (2013–2017). Mohammad Bagher Nobakht  (Vice President and Head of Management and Planning Organization) (2016–2021),  Majid Ansari (Vice President for Legal Affairs) (2016–5017), Hossein-Ali Amiri (Vice President for Legal and Parliamentary Affairs) (2016–2017),  Sorena Sattari (Vice President for Science and Technology Affaires) (2013–present). Shahindokht Molaverdi (Vice President for Women's and Family Affairs) (2014–2017). Masoud Soltanifar (Vice President of Cultural Heritage and Tourism Organization) (2013–2016), Zahra Ahmadipour (Vice President of Cultural Heritage and Tourism Organization) (2013–2016) Ali Akbar Salehi (Vice President and Head of Atomic Energy Organization) (2013–2021), Mohammad-Ali Shahidi (Vice President and Head of Martyrs and Self-sacrifice's Affairs Foundation) (2016–2020). Jamshid Ansari (Vice President and Head of Administrative and Recruitment Organization) (2016–2021). Masumeh Ebtekar (Vice President and Head of Environmental Protection Organization) (2013–2017)
  Vice Presidents -
 abolished (2015–2016)
Nouri al-Maliki (2016–2018), Usama al-Nujayfi (2016–2018), Ayad Allawi (2016–2018)
  Vice President- Kosrat Rasul Ali (2005–2017)
  Speaker of the Knesset (Vice President ex officio) - Yuli-Yoel Edelstein (2013–2020)
  –
Vice presidents de facto -
Vice Chairmen of National Defence Commission -  Hwang Pyong-so (2014–2016), O Kuk-ryol (1998–2016). Ri Yong-mu (2009–2016)
Vice Chairmen of State Affairs Commission - Hwang Pyong-so (2016–2018). Choe Ryong-hae (2016–present). Pak Pong-ju (2016–2021)
Vice presidents de jure - Vice Chairmen of the Presidium of Supreme People's Assembly - Kim Yong-dae (1998–2019). Yang Hyong-sop (1998–2019), Choe Yong-rim (honorary) (2011–2019), Kim Yong-ju (honorary) (1998–2019)
  Vice President –
Bounnhang Vorachith (2006–2016)
Phankham Viphavanh (2016–2021)
  Vice President –
Ahmed Adeeb (2015–2016)
Abdulla Jihad (2016–2018)
 
First# Vice President – 
Sai Mauk Kham (2011–2016)
Myint Swe (2016–2021)
Second Vice President – 
Nyan Tun (2012–2011)
Henry Van Thio (2016–2021)
  Vice President - Nanda Bahadur Pun (2015–present)
  Vice President – 
Jejomar Binay (2010–2016)
Leni Robredo (2016–present)
Syria
 Vice President – Najah al-Attar ((2006–present))

First Vice President – 
Hisham Ibrahim Marwah (2015–2016)
Mouaffaq Nyrabia, (2016–2017)
Second Vice President –
Naghm Al Ghadri (2015–2016)
Abdul Hakim Bashar (2016–2017)
Third Vice President –
vacant (2015–2016)
Samira al-Masalma (2016–2017)
 Vice President –
Wu Den-yih (2012–2016)
Chen Chien-jen (2016–2020)
 Vice President – Sheikh Mohammed bin Rashid Al Maktoum (2006–present)
 Vice President –
Nguyễn Thị Doan (2007–2016)
Đặng Thị Ngọc Thịnh (2016–2021)
Yemen
 Vice President –
Khaled Bahah (2015–2016)
Ali Mohsen al-Ahmar (2016–present)

Europe
  Vice President Margarita Popova  (2012–2017)
  Vice President - Vacant (1974–present)
  President of the Bundesrat (Vice President ex officio) — 
Stanislaw Tillich (2015–2016)
Malu Dreyer (2016–2017)
  Vice President - Doris Leuthard (2016)

North America and the Caribbean
 
First Vice President - Helio Fallas (2014–2018)
Second Vice President - Ana Helena Chacón (2014–2018)
 
First Vice President of Council of State - Miguel Díaz-Canel (2013–2018)
Others Vice Presidents of Council of State - Gladys María Bejerano Portela (2013–2019),  Mercedes Lopez Acea (2013–2018), Jose Ramon Machado Ventura (2013–2018), Ramiro Valdes Menendez (2009–2019), Salvador Valdes Mesa (2013–2019)
  Vice President - Margarita Cedeño de Fernández (2012–2020)
  Vice President - Óscar Ortiz (2014–2019)
  Vice President –
Juan Alfonso Fuentes Soria (2015–2016)
Jafeth Cabrera (2016–2020)
 
First Vice President - Ricardo Antonio Alvarez Arias (2014–2022)
Second Vice President - Ana Rossana Guevara Pinto (2014–2018)
Third Vice President - Lorena Enriqueta Herrera Estevez (2014–2018)
  Vice President - Omar Halleslevens (2012–2017)
  Vice President - Isabel Saint Malo (2014–2019)
  Vice President - Joe Biden (2009–2017)

Oceania
  Vice President 
Teima Onorio (2003–2016)
Kourabi Nenem (2016–2019)
  Vice President - Yosiwo P. George (2015–present)
  Vice President - Antonio Bells - (2013–2017)

South America
  Vice President - Gabriela Michetti (2015–2019)
  Vice President - Álvaro García Linera (2006–2019)
 
Vice President – Michel Temer (2011–2016)
Vice President – Vacant (2016–2018)
  Minister of the Interior and Public Security (Vice President ex officio) - Jorge Burgos (2015–present)
  Vice President - Germán Vargas Lleras (2014–2017)
  Vice President - Jorge Glas (2013–present)
 
First Vice President - Moses Nagamootoo (2015–2020)
Second Vice President - Khemraj Ramjattan (2015–2020)
Third Vice President - Carl Greenidge (2015–2019)
Foursth Vice President - Sydney Allicock (2015–2020)
  Vice President - Juan Afara (2013–2018)
 
First Vice President -
Marsol Espinoza (2011–2016)
Martín Vizcarra (2016–2018)
Second Vice President -
vacant (2012–2016)
Mercedes Aráoz (2016–2018)
  Vice President - Ashwin Adhin (2015–2020)
  Vice President - Raúl Sendic (2015–2017)
  Vice President -
Jorge Arreaza (2013–2016)
Aristóbulo Istúriz (2016–2017)

See also
List of current vice presidents and designated acting presidents
List of vice presidents in 2017

References

Lists of vice presidents